Fall from Grace is the second full-length album by the power metal/progressive metal band by Borealis. It was released in 2011 by Lion Music in North America and by Hydrant Music in Japan.

Track listing

Personnel
Matt Marinelli – vocals, guitars
Sean Werlick – keyboards
Jamie Smith – bass guitar
Sean Dowell – drums
Ken Fobert - guitars

Technical staff 
 Jordan Valeriote - recording, mixing
 Thomas "PLEC" Johansson - mastering

References

External links
 https://web.archive.org/web/20150713103648/http://www.borealismetal.com/albums.html

2011 albums